Juliet Floyd is professor of philosophy at Boston University. Her strongest research interests lie in early analytic philosophy (on which she has edited a volume) and she has used early analytic philosophy as a lens to examine a diverse array of topics.

Education and career
Floyd received a bachelor's degree in philosophy from Wellesley College in 1982, and went on to study at Harvard University, being awarded a doctorate in philosophy in 1990.

After receiving her doctorate, she accepted an appointment as assistant professor of philosophy at the City College of New York. She spent a term as a visiting assistant professor of philosophy at Boston University in 1995, before accepting a permanent associate professorship of philosophy there in 1996.  In 2003 she received cross-appointments in the Institute of Editorial Studies, the Institute for the Philosophy of Religion, and the Department of Philosophy. She was promoted to full professor of philosophy in 2006. Floyd has also spent time as a visiting professor of philosophy at the University of Vienna,  Pantheon-Sorbonne University, and the Michel de Montaigne University Bordeaux 3.

Floyd became an associate senior editor of the Stanford Encyclopedia of Philosophy on topics related to twentieth-century philosophy in 2012, joined the editorial board (for topics related to early analytic philosophy) of the Archiv für Geschichte der Philosophie in 2011, and became an associate editor of the Journal for the History of Early Analytical Philosophy in 2011. She has also served on the editorial board of the Nordic Wittgenstein Review from 2011 to 2013, and on the editorial board (for topics related to early analytic philosophy) of the Journal of the History of Philosophy from 2008 to 2010.

Besides for her academic and editorial appointments, she also served as a fellow of Lichtenberg-Kolleg Institute of Advanced Study, Georg August Universität, Göttingen, in 2009–2010, received a Berlin Prize Fellowship from the American Academy in Berlin in 2008, a Fulbright Senior Research Award in 2003–2004, and has also held a number of other fellowships.

Research areas
Floyd's research has generally centered around twentieth-century philosophy, especially the early development of analytic philosophy. Significant focuses of her research have included comparative analyses of differing accounts of the nature of objectivity and reason, issues of rule-following and skepticism, as well as the limitations of formal logic, analysis, and mathematics.    She has written significantly on the ideas of Ludwig Wittgenstein and Immanuel Kant, and has also made significant forays in to the philosophy of logic, the philosophy of mathematics and the philosophy of language.

Floyd (in conjunction with Hilary Putnam) has suggested a novel reading of Wittgenstein's 'notorious paragraph' that dealt with Gödel's first incompleteness theorem (found in Wittgenstein's Remarks on the Foundations of Mathematics,) positing that Wittgenstein's understanding of the meaning of Gödel's first theorem was far greater than has been commonly viewed, although this reading has been criticized. Floyd and Putnam have also more generally defended Wittgenstein's Remarks as demonstrating a significantly greater understanding of mathematics than he is generally credited with.

Publications
Floyd has written a large number of peer-reviewed papers, and has served as editor for several series, primarily about analytic philosophy.  She has served as the editor of one volume, Future Pasts: The Analytic Tradition in Twentieth Century Philosophy, a collection of essays all related to Burton Dreben's belief that analytic philosophy was a failed effort to bring to philosophy the level of clarity offered by science, and his further belief that it was most important because of its failure to do so. In 2013 she was working on a manuscript that explores the significance of the interactions between Wittgenstein, Turing and Gödel, and was also co-editing a pending volume of essays on the philosophical importance of Turing.

References

External links
Juliet Floyd on PhilPapers

Living people
Analytic philosophers
Wittgensteinian philosophers
American women philosophers
20th-century American philosophers
21st-century American philosophers
Harvard Graduate School of Arts and Sciences alumni
Wellesley College alumni
Year of birth missing (living people)
21st-century American women